Imperial Seal refers to the seal used by East Asian imperial families to endorse imperial edicts.

 Heirloom Seal of the Realm, the official seal of the Chinese Empire
 Imperial Seal of Manchukuo, the official seal of the Manchukuo during World War II
 Imperial Seal of the Mongols, the official seal of various Mongol-led regimes
 Imperial Seal of Japan, one of the official seal of Japan
 Imperial Seal of Korea, the official seal of the short-lived Korean Empire

See also
Seal (East Asia)
Royal seal (disambiguation)